Shoal Lake Airport  is located  northwest of Shoal Lake, Manitoba, Canada.

See also
Shoal Lake Water Aerodrome

References

Registered aerodromes in Manitoba